Minitrans is a bus service operated by Transjakarta from 2017 along with Metrotrans. They are built with New Armada body and Mitsubishi Fuso chassis. Like Metrotrans, they also replaced MetroMini and Kopaja.

See also
Metrotrans
Royaltrans
TransJakarta

References

Buses